The discography of Clare Maguire consists of two studio albums, seven extended plays, eleven singles and five music videos. There is also the accompaniment of bonus tracks and promotional singles and an upcoming Studio EP. Maguire's first release came on 18 October 2010, when "Ain't Nobody" was released in the United Kingdom through Polydor Records. The song marked the first appearance of the artist on the UK Singles Chart, when it debuted at number 78. On 26 October, Maguire released her first extended play, Let's Begin as an iTunes exclusive, with track "You're Electric" being selected as Singles of the Week in December.

Maguire's second single release came in the form of "The Last Dance", which having reached BBC Radio 1's B Playlist; debuted at number 23 in the UK and number 12 in Scotland after released on 20 February – marking Maguire's first top 40 hit. The single was succeeded by the release of the debut album, Light After Dark, which having been first released on 28 February debuted at number 7 on the UK Albums Chart and 34 on Irish Albums Chart.

Albums

Studio albums

Extended plays

Singles

Promotional singles

Music videos

Other appearances

Songwriter credits

Covers
Maguire has covered many songs while on tour and for acoustic sessions. The below shows these.

References

Discographies of British artists
Pop music discographies
 discography